Thiruvan Heera Prassad Chentharassery (29 July 1928 – 27 July 2018), better known as T. H. P. Chentharasseri, was an Indian historian from Kerala. He was one of the leading Keralan historians on the study of the caste system in India.

Life and career
He was born in Ennikkattu tharavadu Othara Thiruvalla Pathanamthitta as the son of Kannan Thiruvan and Aninjan Anima, and resided at Pattom Thiruvananthapuram. His father Thuvan was the Thiuvalla Area Secretary for the organization Sadhujana Paripalana Sankham. 

He attended  Othara Primary School, Chengannur Government High School, Kottayam Karappuzha NSS High School, Changanassery St. Berkmen's College,  Thiruvananthapuram Mar Ivanious College and Thiruvananthapuram MG College. He was an employee in the Accountant General Office.

External links
 Books by and on THP Centharasseri

References

1928 births
2018 deaths
20th-century Indian historians
People from Thiruvalla
Scholars from Kerala